Angola is a 1968 Cor-ten steel sculpture by Isaac Witkin, installed on the Massachusetts Institute of Technology (MIT) campus, in Cambridge, Massachusetts, United States.

See also
 1968 in art

References

1968 sculptures
Massachusetts Institute of Technology campus
Outdoor sculptures in Cambridge, Massachusetts
Steel sculptures in Massachusetts